Rose Christiane Ossouka Raponda (born 30 June 1963) is a Gabonese politician who has served as Vice President of Gabon since January 2023, making her the country's first female vice president. She previously served as Prime Minister of Gabon from July 2020 to January 2023, she was also the country's first female prime minister. She also served as the Mayor of Libreville and later as the country's Defense Minister from February 2019 to July 2020.

Background
Raponda was born on 30 June 1963 in Franceville. Raponda is a member of the Mpongwe people. Raponda received a degree in economics and public finance from the Gabonese Institute of Economy and Finance.

Career
Raponda worked as Director General of the Economy and Deputy Director General the Housing Bank of Gabon. She served as minister of budget and public finance from February 2012 until January 2014. Raponda was elected Mayor of the capital city Libreville on 26 January 2014, representing the ruling Gabonese Democratic Party. She was the first woman to hold the position since 1956 and she served until 2019. She also became President of United Cities and Local Governments Africa.

On 12 February 2019, Raponda was appointed as the Defense Minister of Gabon by president Ali Bongo Ondimba after the failed coup in January 2019. Raponda replaced Etienne Massard Kabinda Makaga, a member of the Bongo family, who had held the position since 2016. On 16 July 2020, Raponda was appointed as the Prime Minister of Gabon, after her predecessor Julien Nkoghe Bekale stepped down. She is the first woman to hold the position. Her appointment is the fourth cabinet shuffle by Ondimba since the failed coup. Her appointment comes during the dual health and economic crises due to the COVID-19 pandemic and the fall in the price of oil, one of the country's main resources.

References

|-

|-

1963 births
Living people
People from Libreville
Mayors of places in Gabon
Women mayors
Gabonese Democratic Party politicians
Women government ministers of Gabon
Female defence ministers
Prime Ministers of Gabon
Defence ministers of Gabon
Women prime ministers
Finance ministers of Gabon
Female finance ministers
21st-century Gabonese politicians
21st-century women politicians